Presenilins-associated rhomboid-like protein, mitochondrial also known as mitochondrial intramembrane cleaving protease PARL is an inner mitochondrial membrane protein that in humans is encoded by the PARL gene on chromosome 3. It is a member of the rhomboid family of intramembrane serine proteases. This protein is involved in signal transduction and apoptosis, as well as neurodegenerative diseases and type 2 diabetes.

Structure

Rhomboid family members share a conserved core of six transmembrane helices (TMHs), with the Ser and His residues required to form the catalytic dyad embedded in TMH-4 and TMH-6, respectively. This dyad is found deep below the membrane surface, which indicates that the hydrolysis of peptide bonds occurs within the hydrophobic phospholipid bilayer membrane. As a member of the Parl subfamily, PARL has an additional N-terminal TMH which may form a loop to the catalytic core.

Function 

This gene encodes a mitochondrial integral membrane protein. Following proteolytic processing of this protein, a small peptide (P-beta) is formed and translocated to the nucleus. This gene may be involved in signal transduction via regulated intramembrane proteolysis of membrane-tethered precursor proteins. Variation in this gene has been associated with increased risk for type 2 diabetes. Alternative splicing results in multiple transcript variants encoding different isoforms.

Additionally, PARL is involved in apoptosis through its interactions with the mitochondrial GTPase optic atrophy 1 (OPA1) and the Bcl-2 family-related protein HAX1. OPA1 mainly regulates mitochondrial fusion in the mitochondrial inner membrane, but after proteolytic cleavage by PARL, its short, soluble form contributes to inhibiting apoptosis by slowing down cytochrome c release, and thus, proapoptotic signaling. Alternatively, PARL can inhibit apoptosis by coordinating with HAX1 to activate HtrA2 protease, thus preventing the accumulation of the proapoptotic Bax.

Clinical significance 

It has been shown that the p.S77N presenilin-associated rhomboid-like protein mutation is not a frequent cause of early-onset Parkinson's disease. Variation in presenilins-associated rhomboid-like protein (PSARL) sequence and/or expression may be an important new risk factor for type 2 diabetes and other components of the metabolic syndrome. Mutations in PARL may also be involved in Leber hereditary optic neuropathy by disrupting normal function of the mitochondria, thus promoting retinal ganglion cell death and neurodegeneration.

Interactions  

PARL has been shown to interact with:
 PINK1,
 OPA1, and
 HAX1.

References

Further reading 

 
 
 
 
 
 

Proteins